Rosiers-d'Égletons (literally Rosiers of Égletons) is a commune in the Corrèze department in central France.

Population

See also
Communes of the Corrèze department
Pope Gregory XI was born in Rosiers-d'Égletons c. 1329

References

Communes of Corrèze